Kathiala is a village in Dera Baba Nanak in Gurdaspur district of Punjab State, India. The village is administrated by Sarpanch an elected representative of the village.

Demography 
, The village has a total number of 183 houses and the population of 991 of which 512 are males while 479 are females.  According to the report published by Census India in 2011, out of the total population of the village 202 people are from Schedule Caste and the village does not have any Schedule Tribe population so far.

See also
List of villages in India

References

External links 
 Tourism of Punjab
 Census of Punjab

Villages in Gurdaspur district